Bomberman Land, known in Japan as , is a video game released for PlayStation Portable on 21 March 2007 in Japan, and in North America and the PAL region in 2008. Part of the Bomberman franchise, it is the sixth game in the Bomberman Land series and the portable counterpart to the console version released for the Nintendo Wii in the same month.

Gameplay
The main game progresses through a series of mini-games, with story scenes in between some of them. The classic multiplayer battle mode can be played with up to 4 players, one per system, with just one copy of the game. Multiplayer mode can also work with most of the Story mode's mini-games.

Reception

The game received "mixed" reviews according to the review aggregation website Metacritic. In Japan, Famitsu gave it a score of 23 out of 40.

References

External links
Hudson Soft page
Rising Star Games page

2007 video games
Land
Hudson Soft games
Multiplayer and single-player video games
Party video games
PlayStation Portable games
PlayStation Portable-only games
Racjin games
Rising Star Games games
Video games developed in Japan